The 1979–80 Syracuse Orangemen men's basketball team represented Syracuse University in NCAA Division I men's competition in the 1979–80 academic year. This was their first season as a member of the Big East Conference.

Schedule

|-
!colspan=6 style=| Regular season

|-
!colspan=9 style=| Big East tournament

|-
!colspan=12 style=|NCAA Tournament

References 

Syracuse
Syracuse Orange men's basketball seasons
Syracuse
Syracuse Orange
Syracuse Orange